Carrie Preston (born June 21, 1967) is an American actress known for her work on the television series True Blood, Person of Interest, Crowded, The Good Wife, The Good Fight, and Claws. Preston received critical acclaim for her portrayal of Elsbeth Tascioni on CBS's drama series The Good Wife and The Good Fight. For her work on The Good Wife, Preston received two nominations for Primetime Emmy Award for Outstanding Guest Actress in a Drama Series, winning once.

Early life and education 
Preston was born in Macon, Georgia, the daughter of Pam and Ray Preston. Her brother is actor John G. Preston.

She earned her Bachelor of Fine Arts degree from the University of Evansville (1990), followed by an acting diploma from the Juilliard School's Drama Division (Group 23: 1990–1994).

Career 
Preston has worked on numerous projects with her husband, actor Michael Emerson, whom she married in 1998. Emerson played Ben Linus on television's Lost, and Preston was a guest star in episode 20 of season 3, "The Man Behind the Curtain" as Ben's mother Emily in flashback scenes, though she and Emerson never shared scenes together. The couple were featured in the 2004 comedy film Straight-Jacket and the 2008 feature film, Ready? OK!. She appeared in several episodes of Person of Interest as Grace Hendricks, the former fiancée of Emerson's character, Harold Finch.

Preston is co-owner of the production company Daisy 3 Pictures with James Vasquez and Mark Holmes. For seven seasons she played Arlene Fowler on True Blood. On July 31, 2010, Preston and Emerson read A. R. Gurney's play Love Letters at the Charleston Stage . They performed it as a fundraiser for the South Carolina's theatre.

Preston had a recurring role playing Elsbeth Tascioni, an eccentric but extremely effective trial lawyer on CBS's The Good Wife. First introduced in season one and recurring on seasons three through seven, the character was a fan favorite, and Preston won the 2013 Primetime Emmy Award for Outstanding Guest Actress in a Drama Series for her work on the show.

On September 6, 2013, it was announced that Preston signed on to play a recurring character in the second season of the Kevin Bacon-led thriller, The Following. She portrayed Judy, a prostitute and ill-fated groupie of Joe Carroll. The show's second season premiered in January 2014. Preston has appeared in a number of films as a supporting character. Including several critically acclaimed films such as Doubt and Duplicity, where she starred alongside stars such as Meryl Streep, Viola Davis, and Clive Owen.

In 2015, she landed a leading role on the short-lived NBC comedy series Crowded where she starred opposite Patrick Warburton, during which time she also appeared on the final season of The Good Wife for which she earned her second Primetime Emmy Award for Outstanding Guest Actress in a Drama Series nomination. Preston was originally slated for a four-episode arc, but due to commitments on her new show, she was only able to appear in one episode.

In August 2016, TNT announced that Preston had been cast in the Rashida Jones drama-comedy Claws. Preston plays Polly Marks (Polly-Pol), a mild-mannered preppy with an "ankle bracelet" who recently served time in prison for identity theft. The series was greenlit for a 10-episode first season.

On December 16, 2016, CBS announced that Preston would reprise her role as Elsbeth Tascioni on The Good Wife spin-off The Good Fight.

Filmography

Film

Television

Stage

Other works

Awards and nominations

References

External links 

 
 
 

1967 births
Living people
20th-century American actresses
21st-century American actresses
Actresses from Georgia (U.S. state)
Actors from Macon, Georgia
American film actresses
American film producers
American stage actresses
American Shakespearean actresses
American television actresses
American women film directors
Primetime Emmy Award winners
Juilliard School alumni
University of Evansville alumni
Film directors from Georgia (U.S. state)
American women film producers